Henry Spence Turpie (9 September 1875 – 18 December 1945)  was a Scottish-American professional golfer. He had two top-10 finishes in golf major championship tournaments. Turpie finished T5 in the 1909 Western Open, shooting a course record tying 69 in the final round.

Early life
Turpie was born on 9 September 1875 a few blocks from the Old Course at St Andrews, Scotland, to shoemaker Henry Turpie and his wife Margaret Turpie (née Allan). Like nearly all the golf professionals of his era, he was also a club maker. In the late 19th century he emigrated to the United States and became a naturalized citizen. One of his first jobs was head professional at Edgewater Country Club near Chicago. In 1898 his brother George, also a professional golfer, would make the Atlantic crossing to join him at Edgewater as an assistant.

Golf career

1895 Open Championship

Prior to his emigration to America, Turpie was a competitor in the 1895 Open Championship which was the 35th Open Championship, held 12–13 June at the Old Course at St Andrews, Fife, Scotland. Defending champion J. H. Taylor won the Championship for the second time, by four strokes from runner-up Sandy Herd. Turpie finished the tournament tied for 31st place. In 1896 he played in the same tournament and finished 37th.

Oconomowoc Tournament
In August 1899 Turpie won a well-attended professional tournament hosted by the Oconomowoc Country Club in Oconomowoc, Wisconsin. He prevailed over a host of excellent players, including Alex Smith, Fred Herd, James Foulis, David Foulis, Willie Smith, and others. Turpie shot 151 over the four 9-hole rounds played and finished one stroke ahead of Alex Smith. With golf being a relatively new sport for American spectators in the late 19th century, the play by the professionals was enjoyed by fans more used to yachting events.

U.S. Open

Turpie had early success in America when he placed eighth in the 1900 U.S. Open, held 4–5 October 1900, at Chicago Golf Club in Wheaton, Illinois. He carded rounds of 84-87-79-84=334 and won $25. He posted an identical eighth-place finish in the 1902 U.S. Open held October 10–11 at Garden City Golf Club in Garden City, New York, on Long Island, east of New York City. He posted scores of 79-85-78-78=320 and won $50 in prize money.

Later life
By 12 September 1918, at the age of 43, he was living in Bogalusa, Louisiana, when he registered for the draft in World War I.

Death
Turpie died on 18 December 1945 at the age of 70. He had a heart attack while heading to his work at a driving range in City Park, New Orleans. He was survived by his wife and a son, Henry S. Turpie.

Results in major championships

Note: Turpie played only in the U.S. Open and The Open Championship.

DNP = Did not play
? = unknown
"T" indicates a tie for a place
Yellow background for top-10

References

Scottish male golfers
Golfers from St Andrews
Scottish emigrants to the United States
1875 births
1945 deaths